Dülük is a village in Şehitkamil district, a district of Gaziantep, Turkey. The population of Dülük was 2,256 as of 2012. Its ancient name was Doliche.

History 
Finds in Tell Dülük include stone tools from 30 to 40 thousand years ago. These tools are from a Neolithic culture, unofficially dubbed the "Dulicien culture" by researchers.

Hittite period
During the Hittite period, it was a stop on the road connecting the Mediterranean to Mesopotamia. It was also a religious center. The sanctuary of the Hittite god Teshub was just to the north of the village.

Hellenistic period
In the literary sources, the existence of the Hellenistic colony is not attested before the 2nd century BC. It is speculated that part of the original colonial population of Doliche came from the homonymous Thessalian city. The discovery of Rhodean amphorae handles suggest communications with the Aegean Sea during the 3rd and 2nd centuries BC. The Seleucids adopted the worship of the local storm-god as Zeus Dolichenus, identified with Baal. At this time it was a small city on the road from Germanicia to Zeugma.

Doliche was at one time considered to belong to the ancient region of Cyrrhestica. It was ruled by the Kingdom of Commagene "for about 35 years"; after being governed by Antiochus Theos, it might have been incorporated into the Roman province of Syria as early as 31 BCE.

Roman period 
Commagene was definitively annexed to the Roman Empire in 72 CE. It was incorporated into the Roman province of Syria, Under Roman rule, Doliche remained part of the region of Commagene, a region of the Roman province of Syria, and as that was portioned of the provinces Coele-Syria and ultimately of Syria Euphratensis.

The worship of Jupiter Dolichenus became widespread from the mid-second to the mid-third century CE, particularly though not exclusively in the Roman army. A number of religious monuments of Jupiter Dolichenus refer to him as the "god of the Commagenians".

Doliche struck its own coins from the reign of Marcus Aurelius to Caracalla. Archaeological finds in Doliche include an underground Mithraic temple, rock graves and stone quarries from which giant rock blocks are produced.

The Marcianus, who was Apollonius of Athens follower, was from Doliche.

In 2014, a team of German archaeologists from the University of Münster announced the excavation of a relief depicting an Iron Age deity previously unknown to them on a stele among the remains of Mar Solomon, a medieval monastery uncovered during 2010 excavations in Doliche. The monastery had been known only through writings indicating that it had been used through the era of the crusades. The University of Münster's Asia Minor Research Centre has been conducting excavation work at the main sanctuary of Jupiter Dolichenus under the direction of Engelbert Winter and Michael Blömer and is supported by the German Research Foundation (Deutsche Forschungsgesellschaft, DFG). The international group consists of archaeologists, historians, architects, conservators, archaeozoologists, geoinformation scientists, and excavation workers. Winter's field work at the sanctuary dates back to 2001.

Medieval history 
The town, of strategic importance due to its location at the intersection of roads linking the major cities of the region, was conquered by Iyad ibn Ghanm during the first decades of the Muslim conquests. It hence became a frontier outpost of the nascent Islamic Caliphate against the Byzantine Empire, forming part of the fortified frontier zone (al-'Awasim) after the reign of Harun al-Rashid.
 
In the middle of the 10th century, it played a role in the conflict between resurgent Byzantium and the Hamdanid emirate of Sayf al-Dawla, and was retaken by the Byzantines in 962. The town again became a battleground during the Crusades until it was definitely captured by atabeg Nur al-Din of Aleppo in 1155; by that time, it had declined to obscurity, its fortress in ruins and the once prosperous town reduced to a small village.

During the Crusades, the town was called Tulupa, and part of the Crusader County of Edessa.

Ecclesiastical history 
Doliche was an episcopal see, suffragan of the Metropolitan of Hierapolis Bambyce (capital of Euphratensis, in the civil diocese of Oriens), in the sway of the patriarchate of Antioch.

The names of eight of its Byzantine bishops are known:
 Archelaus, present at the First Council of Nicaea (325), and at the Synod of Antioch (341)
 Olympius attended the schismatical synod of Philippopolis held in 347 by Arian bishops opposing the decision sof the canonical Council of Serdica (344) 
 Cyrion at the Council of Seleucia (359)
 Maris, during whose consecration circa 330 an Arian woman fatally stabbed Eusebius of Samosata, a bitter adversary of that heresy; he attended the First Council of Constantinople (381)
 Abibus, a Nestorian, too old in 431 to attend the Council of Ephesus, which deposed him as heretic in 434
 Athanasius, his successor elected by the council
 Timothy, a correspondent of Theodoret, present at the Robber Council of Ephesus, at a Synod of Antioch in 450 on the orthodoxy of Athanasius of Perra and at the Council of Chalcedon (451); in 457 he signed the decreto of Patriarch Gennadius I of Constantinople against simony
 Philoxenus, a nephew of the celebrated Philoxenus of Hierapolis, deposed as a Severian Encratite in 518 for Monophysitism, reinstated in 533 after recanting that heresy in Constantinople

The see figures in the first Notitiae Episcopatuum, about 840. There is a dubious claim that Doliche later took the place of Hierapolis as metropolis.

Although the Arab conquest wiped the Byzantine institutions, Christianity persisted. Fourteen Jacobite Bishops are known from the eighth to ninth century.

Titular see 
The diocese was nominally restored in the eighteenth century by the Roman Catholic Church as Latin titular bishopric of Doliche (Latin = Curiate Italian) / Dolichen(us) (Latin).
 

References

Sources and external links 
 GCatholic - (former &) titular Latin see
 Bibliography - ecclesiastical history
 Pius Bonifacius Gams, Series episcoporum Ecclesiae Catholicae, Leipzig 1931, p. 436
 Michel Lequien, Oriens christianus in quatuor Patriarchatus digestus, Paris 1740, vol. II, coll. 937-940
 Konrad Eubel, Hierarchia Catholica Medii Aevi, vol. 3, p. 187; vol. 6, p. 198
 Franz Cumont, Etudes syriennes, Paris 1917, pp. 173 seq.
 Raymond Janin, lemma 'Doliché', in Dictionnaire d'Histoire et de Géographie ecclésiastiques, vol. XIV, Paris 1960, coll. 578-580

Villages in Gaziantep Province
Şehitkamil District
Populated places in ancient Commagene
Hellenistic colonies in Anatolia
Catholic titular sees in Asia
Ancient Greek archaeological sites in Turkey